In the AFL Women's (AFLW), the Collingwood best and fairest award is awarded to the best and fairest player at the Collingwood Football Club during the home-and-away season. The award has been awarded annually since the competition's inaugural season in 2017, and Nicola Stevens was the inaugural winner of the award.

Recipients

See also

 Copeland Trophy (list of Collingwood Football Club best and fairest winners in the Australian Football League)

References

AFL Women's awards
Lists of AFL Women's players
Collingwood Football Club (AFLW) players
Awards established in 2017